The 43rd International Emmy Awards took place on November 23, 2015, in New York Hilton Midtown in New York City. The award ceremony, presented by the International Academy of Television Arts and Sciences (IATAS), honors all TV programming produced and originally aired outside the United States. This year's ceremony was hosted by Egyptian satirist Bassem Youssef.

Ceremony  
Nominations for the 43rd International Emmy Awards were announced on October 5, 2015, by the International Academy of Television Arts & Sciences (IATAS) at a Press Conference at Mipcom in Cannes. There are 40 nominees across 10 categories and 19 countries. Nominees come from: Angola, Austria, Argentina, Belgium, Brazil, Canada, Colombia, France, Japan, Mexico, Netherlands, Norway, Portugal, Spain, South Africa, South Korea, Turkey, United Kingdom and the United States.

In addition to the presentation of the International Emmys for programming and performances, the International Academy presented two special awards. Downton Abbey creator, Julian Fellowes received the Founders Award and Richard Plepler, chairman and CEO of HBO network, received the Directorate Award.

Summary

Winners and nominees

References

External links 
 Official website
 43rd International Emmy Awards

International Emmy Awards ceremonies
International
International